Ultra Cruiser, UltraCruiser or Ultracruiser may refer to:
Bilsam Ultra Cruiser, a Polish microlight aircraft design
Hummel Ultracruiser, an American ultralight aircraft design